Northwest Pipeline is a natural gas pipeline network which takes gas from western Canada and the Rocky Mountains via the Westcoast Pipeline and brings it into California, either through Gas Transmission Northwest or Kern River. A small amount of gas goes through the San Juan Basin to El Paso Natural Gas. It is owned by the Williams Companies.  Its FERC code is 37.

Northwest Pipeline gathers from the Rockies and Canada.  Its primary market is the Northwestern states.  Its biggest market is the greater Seattle area.

References

External links 
 Pipeline Electronic Bulletin Board

Natural gas pipelines in Canada
Natural gas pipelines in the United States
Canada–United States relations
Natural gas pipelines in Washington (state)
Natural gas pipelines in Oregon
Natural gas pipelines in California
Transportation buildings and structures in Idaho